Operation Steel was a cross-border operation by the Turkish Armed Forces into northern Iraq between 20 March and 4 May 1995 against the Kurdistan Workers' Party (PKK). The purpose of offensive was to put a stop to the PKK cross-border raids and to crush the insurgency. The PKK was not defeated in the operation.

The battle
On March 20, 1995, some 35,000 Turkish troops launched an invasion into northern Iraq. The effect of the attack was however relatively limited, despite high PKK casualties, as the majority of the PKK forces left the region even before the offensive begun. They had noticed the military buildup on the border and were anticipating the offensive. By April 25, Turkey pulled out 20,000 of its 35,000 troops. On May 3, after the Kurdistan Democratic Party delegation to Turkey said that they would stop PKK activities in Iraqi Kurdistan, Turkey withdrew its remaining forces on May 4. The military operation strained relations between Turkey and the United States and Europe, as over 15,000 Iraqi Kurdish civilians were displaced by Turkish forces.

Casualties 

More than 35,000 troops took part in the operation. Turkey announced fatalities of a total of 64 personnel: 4 commissioned officers, 5 noncommissioned officers and 55 soldiers. Turkey also announced their total number of injured personnel at 185 personnel: 13 commissioned officers, 8 noncommissioned officers and 164 soldiers. Turkey announced the total number of militants neutralized at a total of 568, with 555 being killed and 13 being captured live or injured. The PKK claimed that they had killed 261 soldiers and that only 18 of their fighters were killed during the operation.

See also
Operation Hammer (1997)
Operation Dawn (1997)
Iraqi Kurdish Civil War

References

1995 in Turkey
1995 in Iraq
Conflicts in 1995
Cross-border operations of Turkey into Iraq
History of the Kurdistan Workers' Party